Al Ahsa (locally pronounced al-Ḥasāʾ) is the largest governorate in Saudi Arabia's Eastern Province, named after the Al-Ahsa Oasis. The name Al-Ahsa is also given to the biggest city in the governorate, Hofuf. In Classical Arabic, 'Ahsa' means the sound of water underground. It has one of the largest oases in the world with world-renowned date palms and, according to one author, the oases of Al-Hasa and Al Ain (in the UAE, on the border with Oman) are the most important in the Arabian Peninsula. All urban areas are located in the traditional oasis of Al-Hasa. In addition to the oasis, the county also includes the giant Empty Quarter desert, making it the largest governorate in Saudi Arabia in terms of area. The Empty Quarter has the world's largest oil fields, and connects Saudi Arabia to Qatar, the UAE, and Oman. The Governorate's population is over 1,100,000. In the past, Al-Ahsa belonged to the historical region known as Bahrain, along with Qatif and the present-day Bahrain islands.

One campus of a major Saudi university, King Faisal University, founded in 1975, is located in Al-Ahsa with the faculties of agriculture, veterinary medicine and animal resources. The Hofuf campus also has facilities where Saudi women can study medicine, dentistry and home economics. A large branch of the private Arab Open University is also located in Al-Ahsa.

History 

The history of the formation of Al-Ahsa goes back to the beginning stages of human existence in oasis, which was started by the Shepherd Semites, and the subsequent migrations of the major Semitic tribes in the Arabian Peninsula to the north and east. Moreover, one of the first civilizations that appeared in Al-Ahsa was Phoenicia civilization. This was determined by tombs that date back to five thousand years that were discovered on the coasts of Al-Ahsa and the neighboring island Bahrain. These are believed to be of Phoenician origin. Furthermore, the antiquities found in these tombs were later sent to the British Museum.

Al-Ahsa had been inhabited since prehistoric times for its geographical and agricultural importance. An example of its geographical importance would be that it served as a crossing for them to the Fertile Crescent. In addition to that, is that it is serves a commercial importance as it is a crossroads of several trade routes linking the Arabian Peninsula with Persia and India through the port of Uqair and the port of Qatif. In terms of agricultural importance, Al-Ahsa is of great importance since its area is made up of fertile lands and contains abundant water sources.

It is known that the Phoenicians are one of the branches of the Canaanites. The Canaanites moved from the Gulf coast to the Mediterranean coast and settled in Lebanon, Syria and Palestine, carrying with them the names of their cities such as Tyre, Arwad, Byblos and others. Following the migration of the Canaanites from the Al-Ahsa coast, the Jerhaites, a branch of the Chaldeans, settled in their place. Their description of their city came from the Greek traveler Strabo, who said about Al-Ahsa: "It was founded by Chaldean immigrants from Babylon in a swampy land, and it was built of salt stones, eighty thousand cubits away from the sword of the sea."The Greek historian Polybius also described Al-Ahsa as an important commercial center, one of the active markets in the Arab countries, and a crossroads for the caravan routes coming from southern Arabia, the Levant, the Hijaz, Iraq and India. The inhabitants of those countries were among the richest peoples of the island. Their wealth was gold and silver, which stirred greed. At the same time, the Seleucid king Antiochus III led his fleet in 205 BC. He crossed the Tigris, heading to it to seize its treasures, but its people, fearing them for their city and out of their love for peace and in order to preserve their freedom that they cherished, sent a delegation to him carrying a large gift of gold and precious stones. So Antiochus accepted the gift And he closed back to his country, and perhaps the barren desert and the adventure of the trip was the main reason that convinced the Seleucid king to return from his determination.

City of Hejir 
Al-Ahsa was then became a part of a city belonging to the territory of Bahrain at that time, located between Ras Al-Qara mountain, Abu Hasis mountain, and the northern part of Jabal al-Qarah in Al-Ahsa today a place now called the town of Al-Kawarij. The town was of importance to the inhabitants of the Arabian Peninsula, because of the port of Al-Uqair, which served as a link in bringing goods and exporting them to and from Persia, India, China, Africa and Mesopotamia.The port made it the great market for the central and eastern regions of it.

When the Islamic call appeared, the Messenger Muhammad sent Al-Ala bin Abdullah Al-Hadrami in the seventh century AD  corresponding to the eighth year of the Hijri to invite the people of Hejir to Islam, which they accepted.

Islamic times 
Eastern Arabia was conquered by the emerging Rashidun Caliphate during the 7th century. It was later inherited by the Umayyads and Abbasids. In 899 A.D., the region came under the control of the Qarmatian leader, Abu Tahir al-Jannabi, and was declared independent from the Abbasid Caliphate of Baghdad. Its capital was at al-Mu'miniya near modern Hofuf. By circa 1000, Al-Hasa became the 9th largest city worldwide supporting 100,000 inhabitants. In 1077, the Qarmatian state of Al-Ahsa was overthrown by the Uyunids. Al-Ahsa subsequently fell under the rule of the Bahrani dynasty of the Usfurids, followed by their relatives, the Jabrids, who became one of the most formidable powers in the region, retaking the islands of Bahrain from the princes of Hormuz. The last Jabrid ruler of Bahrain was Muqrin ibn Zamil.

In 1521, the Portuguese Empire conquered the Awal Islands (the islands that comprise present day Bahrain) from the Jabrid ruler Muqrin ibn Zamil, who fell strongly in battle. The Jabrids struggled to maintain their position on the mainland in the face of the Ottomans and their tribal allies, the Muntafiq. In 1550, Al-Ahsa and nearby Qatif came under the sovereignty of the Ottoman Empire with Sultan Suleiman I. Al-Ahsa was nominally the Eyalet of Lahsa in the Ottoman administrative system, and was usually a vassal of the Porte. Qatif was later lost to the Portuguese.

The Ottomans were expelled from Al-Ahsa in 1670, and the region came under the rule of the chiefs of Banu Khalid tribe.

Al-Ahsa, along with Qatif, was incorporated into the Wahhabist Emirate of Diriyah in 1795, but returned to Ottoman control in 1818 with an invasion ordered by Muhammad Ali of Egypt. The Banu Khalid were again installed as rulers of the region but, in 1830, the Emirate of Nejd retook the region.

Direct Ottoman rule was restored in 1871, and Al-Ahsa was placed first under Baghdad Vilayet and with Baghdad's subdivision Basra Vilayet in 1875. In 1913, ibn Saud, the founder of modern Saudi Arabia, annexed Al-Ahsa and Qatif into his domain of Najd.

Al-Ahsa has been inhabited since prehistoric times, due to its abundance of water.

627 CE: Muhammad orders the Third Raid on Banu Thalabah in Al-Taraf, now part of the Al-Ahsa governorate.

899: Al-Ahsa comes under control of the Qarmatian leader, Abu-Sa'id Jannabi, and is declared independent from the Abbasids of Baghdad.  The capital is Al-Mu'miniya (near modern Hofuf).

1000: Al-Ahsa is among the 10 largest cities on earth, with 110,000 inhabitants.

1077: The Qarmatian state of Al-Ahsa is overthrown by the Uyunids.

1238: Usfurid dynasty takes over the region of Al-Ahsa and Al-Qatif.

1383: Usfurids are overthrown by the Jarwanids.

1440: The Jabrids take over Al-Ahsa, Qatif, Bahrain, and Kish Island, and extend their influence to eastern Nejd.

1521: Jabrid kingdom falls to the Muntafiq tribe of southern Iraq, who rule Al-Ahsa on behalf of the Ottoman Empire. The Ottomans station their garrisons in the region.

1670: the Ottomans are expelled by the tribe of Banu Khalid, who make their capital in Al-Mubarraz.

1795: Conquered by Saudi troops during the formation of the First Saudi State.

1818: Reconquered by the Ottoman Empire by Ottoman Egyptian forces overthrowing the First Saudi State in the process and granting the local tribe of Banu Khalid self-rule.

1830: Comes under the control of the Second Saudi State.

1871: The Second Saudi Dynasty loses the region to the Ottoman Empire again; however, this time it is directly ruled from Baghdad instead of by tribe of Bani Khalid under self-rule has had been the case in the past during Ottoman ownerships.

1913: King Abdulaziz Al Saud conquers Al-Ahsa Oasis, annexing it into his Kingdom of Najd. (This is recognised in the Treaty of Sèvres signed in 1920 with the other official partitionings of the Ottoman Empire.)

1932: Al-Ahsa becomes part of the Kingdom of Saudi Arabia, under the King Abdulaziz.

1930s: Huge petroleum deposits are discovered near Dammam, resulting in rapid modernization for the region.

Early 1960s: The oil fields in Al-Ahsa reach the production level of 1 million barrels per day.

Population and economy
According to 2005 estimate, Al-Ahsa has over 908,000 people.  All local residents are Muslim, including both Shia and Sunnis.  Over the centuries, residents of the oasis have included the Banu Abdul Qays, the Banu Uqayl, and the Bani Khalid.

Oil production and agriculture are the two main economic activities of the Al-Ahsa. Al-Ahsa is the home of some of the richest oil fields in the world.

Natural fresh-water springs have surfaced in the region for millennia, encouraging human habitation and agricultural efforts (date palm cultivation especially) since prehistoric times. The Saudi Ministry of Agriculture established a factory to process its rich date harvest at the rate of five tons daily. Other components of its agricultural output include rice, corn, citrus, and other fruits. In addition, intensive livestock raising, involving thousands of sheep, goats, cattle and camels and more than 15 major poultry farms producing more than 100 million eggs a year, make Al-Ahsa one of the major food producers for the kingdom.

Manufacturing—both the traditional small-scale cottage industry kind (e.g. the traditional  mantle and pottery) and large-scale industries such as cement and plastics—has also been strongly encouraged.

Transportation

Airport
Al-Ahsa International Airport (IATA: HOF) is the city's main airport. The airport is located 25 km from the city center and serves weekly local flights to Jeddah, Al-Medina and international flights to Dubai.

Roads
The city is served by a modern major highway system;
Al-Ahsa / Riyadh highway; that links the city to KSA central region. 
Al-Ahsa / Dammam highway; that links the city to the rest of KSA eastern region and Kuwait. 
Al-Ahsa / Abu Dhabi highway; that links the city to UAE and Oman.

Railway
The city has a railway station connecting the city with the capital Riyadh to the west and Dammam to the north

Buses
The main charter bus company in the kingdom, known as the Saudi Public Transport Company (SAPTCO), offers trips both within the kingdom and to its neighboring countries.

International Standings 

 It has become the first city in the Persian Gulf region to be listed under the UNESCO's Creative Cities Network in the fields of crafts and folk art.
 It was also designated as a World Heritage Site by the UNESCO in 2018.
 In 2019, Al-Ahasa was selected as the Arab Tourism Capital.

Palm trees 
The Al-Ahsa region boasts over 30 million palm trees. The Ministry of Agriculture has set up a factory to process its rich output of dates, amounting to five tons daily.

Main cities 
 Al-Hofuf is the capital city of the Al-Ahsa province and has many traditional markets.
 Al-Mubarraz (also spelled Al-Mobarraz), in Arabic  المبرز,  is one of the two main cities of the governorate.
 Al-Oyoon (also spelled Al-Uyoon or Al-Oyoun)
 Al-Omran (also spelled Al-Umran), in Arabic العمران, has an area of more than 6 km² and a population of more than 49,000 (in 1997). It consists of about 17 villages, including Al-Hutah, Al-Rumailah, North Al-Omran, South Al-Omran, Ghomsi, Al-Ulayyah, Abu Al-Hasa, Abu Thur, Al-Sayayrah, Al-Suwydrah, Al-Aramyah, Fariq Al-Raml, Wasit, Al- Shuwaikiah, Al-Sabaykh and Al-Nakheel. The Al-Sawab Club is situated in Al-Omran.
 Shaybah (oil town in the Empty Quarter)

Administrative subdivisions 
The governorate of Al-Ahsa has seven marakiz. They do not have any administrative functions, but can still be proclaimed as an administrative division.

The marakiz are:

 Al Hafayer
 Al Ubaylah
 Al-Jafr, Saudi Arabia
 Haradh
Hofuf
Rumailah, Saudi Arabia
Shaybah

Villages 
Al-Ahsa is a large area where a lot of villages and small towns are located. The villages are normally grouped into two main groups according to their relative location to the oasis. Although the villages lack big markets and/or hospitals, there are few good polyclinics and small markets. You can find small bank branches and automated teller machines in many villages. Recently there have been a great improvement in road maintenance and re-construction of some main roads between villages and cities.

Al-Ahsa has about 50 villages, following is a list of some according to their location:

Eastern villages 
Here is an incomplete list (population in 1997):
Al-Taraf (+27,000) which is famous for its four hills and its small zoo. Al-Rumailah (probably +12,020) It is well known because Al-Romailah existed at the time of Muhammad
Al-Holailah (+21,000)
Al-Battaliyah (+20,000)
Al-Shu'bah (+17,000)
Al-Omran (+49,000) which is a well-known village and has its own municipality
Al-Munaizlah (+17,000)
Al-Garah (+13,000) which is well known for its mountain Jabl Al-Garah
Al-Jafr (+13,000) which is well known for its own police station and other government offices
Al-Mansorah (+10,000)
Al-Towaithir (+8000)
Al-Fudhool (+8000)
Al-Markaz (+9000) (also spelled Al-Markez).
Al-Hotah (Probably +7000)
Bani Ma'an, one of the oldest villages. It is believed that it was bigger in the past.
Al-Dalwah
Al-Shahareen
Al-Sabat
Abu Thor
Al-Turaibil
Al-Tuhaimiyah
Al-Mizawi
Al-Jeshah (+29,000)
Al-Jubail (+10,000)

Northern villages
Here is an incomplete list:
Al-Gherain
Al-Mutairfi (+29,000) which is well known for its  natural springs
Al-Julaijlah
Al-Marah
Al-Garn
Al-Shigaig
Al-Wazziyah.

Associated small villages
Here is an incomplete list:
Al Hafayer
Yabrin

Climate 
Al-Ahsa has a dry, tropical climate, with a five-month summer and a relatively cold winter. It enjoys the benefit of copious reserves of underground water which has allowed the area to develop its agricultural potential. Nevertheless, Al-Ahsa has to deal with tons of sand which the wind carries and deposits over the land. To counter this problem, the Kingdom has planted large barriers of trees to prevent the wind-borne sand from damaging inhabited and agricultural areas.

Recreation sites 

One of the oldest mosques in Islam, Jawatha Mosque, is reputed to be found here, as well, and several historic remnants of Ottoman Turkish influence can be seen in buildings such as Qasr Ibrahim and the Qasr Sahood. 
Many pictures of old Al-Ahsa and the Eastern Province were taken by the Danish explorer and convert to Islam Knud Holmboe (1902–1931) in his travels through the Middle East.

Here is a list of some historical and recreation sites:
Jawatha Mosque

Uqair: Seaport is situated on the Persian Gulf in eastern Al-Ahsa. It has lost its focal role as a fishing and transport site, and is now an outing place for people of the region.
Qaṣr Ibrāhīm is a castle built during Ottoman rule. It is located prominently in Al-Hofuf city.
Natural Springs like those in Umm Sabaa provides curative mineral water at a steady rate.
Jabl Al-Garah is a hill (locally called a mountain) in Al-Garah a village of the same name offers visitors cool air in the summer months.

 Qasr Sahood is a Palace built during Ottoman rule in the city of Al-Mubarraz.
 Al-Shuʿbah Mountain.
 Al-Ahsa National Museum.
 Al-Ahsa National Park, located at Al-Omran town.

See also 
Eastern Province, Saudi Arabia
Ghawar Field, Earth's largest, has produced over half of all Saudi oil

Citations

References 
 Riyadh Newspaper
 Recreation Utilities in Al-Ahsa by Abdullah Al-Shayeb

Sources 
 Al-Ahsa a Geographical Study by Abdullah Al-Taher
 Recreation Utilities in Al-Ahsa by Abdullah Al-Shayeb

External links 
Municipality of Al-Ahsa  (Arabic)
Al-Ahsa Website

Eastern Province, Saudi Arabia
Oases of Saudi Arabia
Governorates of Saudi Arabia
Al-Ahsa Governorate